Meadia roseni is an eel in the family Synaphobranchidae (cutthroat eels). It was described by Michael Hin-Kiu Mok, Chi-Ying Lee, and Hung-Jung Chan in 1991. It is a marine, deep water-dwelling eel which is known from Taiwan, in the northwestern Pacific Ocean.

The species epithet refers to Donn Eric Rosen.

References

Synaphobranchidae
Fish described in 1991